Erika Westman (born 11 June 1971) is a Swedish female curler.

Teams

References

External links
 

Living people
1971 births
Swedish female curlers